Asgarby is a hamlet in the East Lindsey district of Lincolnshire, England. It lies just south from the B1195, a road that runs past the battlefield at Winceby. Asgarby is on the opposite side of the road to the battlefield.

Asgarby was listed in the Domesday Book of 1086.

References

External links
 
 

Hamlets in Lincolnshire
East Lindsey District